María Isabel is a Mexican telenovela produced by Carla Estrada for Televisa. It aired on Canal de las Estrellas from August 4, 1997 to February 6, 1998. María Isabel, is one of the few telenovelas that focuses on the life of an indigenous female protagonist and her community. The story was written by Yolanda Vargas Dulché and adapted by René Muñoz.

The series stars Adela Noriega, Fernando Carrillo, Lorena Herrera and Rafael Rojas.

Plot
María Isabel is a beautiful, kind-hearted young woman of indigenous descent, faced with the responsibility of raising Rosa Isela, the orphaned daughter of her only true friend who has died.

She finds employment at the home of Ricardo Mendiola, a wealthy widower, and his young daughter, Gloria. Ricardo's kindness and decency cause Maria Isabel to fall in love with him, though she keeps it a secret for many years.

Gloria, however, influences Rosa Isela to feel ashamed of her "Indian" mother; the ungrateful child abandons Maria Isabel to live with her wealthy grandfather, without even a word of thanks.

At last Ricardo, realizing that he is in love with her, asks Maria Isabel to be his wife. But their bliss is short-lived, and the couple will have many challenges ahead before they can find the happiness they have struggled all their lives to achieve.

Cast
 
Adela Noriega as María Isabel Sanchez
Fernando Carrillo as Ricardo Mendiola Zúñiga
Lorena Herrera as Lucrecia Fontaner Hernández
Rafael Rojas as Rigoberto
Jorge Vargas as Don Félix Pereyra
Patricia Reyes Spíndola as Manuela Rojas López
Lilia Aragón as Rosaura Méndez Larrea
Mónica Miguel as Chona
José Carlos Ruiz as Pedro
Alejandro Aragón as Leobardo Rangel
Raúl Araiza as Andrés
Emoé de la Parra as Déborah Serrano
Juan Felipe Preciado as Rómulo Altamirano
Rodrigo Vidal as Gilberto
Roberto Ballesteros as Armando Noguera
Jorge Salinas as Rubén
Polo Ortín as Ministerio Vilchis
Guillermo Aguilar as Dr. Rivas
Isabel Martínez "La Tarabilla" as Chole
Javier Herranz as José Luis
Angelina Peláez as Micaela
Ilse as Graciela Pereyra
Charlie as Nicolás
Susana González as Elisa de Mendiola
Valentino Lanús as Antonio Altamirano
Sabine Moussier as Mireya Serrano
Omar Alexander as Anselmo
Ángeles Balvanera as Panchita 
Eduardo Benfato as Filiberto
Paty Bolaños as Abundia de Altamirano
Marcelo Buquet as Cristóbal
Julio Monterde as Dr. Carmona
Fátima Torre as Maria Isabel (child)
Naydelin Navarrete as Graciela Pereyra (child)/Rosa Isela (10 years old)
Ximena Sariñana as Rosa Isela (13 years old)
Paola Otero as Gloria Mendiola
Violeta Isfel as Gloria Mendiola (10 years old)
Andrea Lagunes as Gloria Mediola (6 years old)
Natalia Juárez as Rosa Isela (baby)
Ana Luisa Peluffo as Iris
Enrique Rojo as Andrés
Bertha Moss as Eugenia
Yadhira Carrillo as Josefina
Sergio Basañez as Gabriel
Abraham Ramos as Ramón
Aurora Clavel as Amargura
Guillermo Rivas as Father Salvador
Patricia Martínez as Matilde
Tania Vázquez as Sonia
Carlos López Estrada as Pedrito
Magda Guzmán as Director
Andrea Torre as Gloria's friend
Ernesto Laguardia as Luis Torres

Awards

References

External links

 María Isabel at TV Guide
María Isabel at univision.com (in Spanish)

1997 telenovelas
Female characters in comics
Mexican comics adapted into films
Mexican comics titles
Mexican telenovelas
1997 Mexican television series debuts
1998 Mexican television series endings
Spanish-language telenovelas
Television shows set in Mexico City
Televisa telenovelas
Television shows based on comics